Trygve Schjøtt (5 August 1882 – 18 December 1960) was a Norwegian sailor who competed in the 1920 Summer Olympics. He was a crew member of the Norwegian boat Mosk II, which won the gold medal in the 10 metre class (1919 rating).

References

External links 
 
 

1882 births
1960 deaths
Norwegian male sailors (sport)
Olympic sailors of Norway
Olympic gold medalists for Norway
Olympic medalists in sailing
Medalists at the 1920 Summer Olympics
Sailors at the 1920 Summer Olympics – 10 Metre